A Mayo County Council election was held in County Mayo, Ireland on 24 May 2019 as part of that year's local elections. All 30 councillors were elected for a five-year term of office from 6 local electoral areas (LEAs) by single transferable vote.

The 2018 LEA boundary review committee significantly altered the LEAs used in the 2014 elections. Its terms of reference required no change in the total number of councillors but set a maximum LEA size of seven councillors, less than the eight seats of two 2014 LEAs. Other changes were necessitated by population shifts revealed by the 2016 census. The changes were enacted by statutory instrument (S.I.) No. 627/2018.

Results by party

Results by local electoral area

Ballina

Belmullet

Castlebar

Claremorris

Swinford

Westport

Results by gender

Footnotes

Sources

References 

2019 Irish local elections
2019